Johann Jakob Blumer (29 August 1819, in Glarus – 12 November 1875) was a Swiss statesman.

Blumer studied in Zürich, Bonn, and Berlin. In 1843 he was elected to the Landrat, and in 1861 became president of the Court of Appeals. Between 1861 and 1874 he completed his revision of the civil and criminal law of Switzerland, and subsequently he was chosen as President of the Federal Supreme Court of Switzerland.

Works

Notes

References

External links
 
 
 

1819 births
1875 deaths
19th-century male writers
19th-century Swiss historians
19th-century Swiss judges
19th-century Swiss writers
Federal Supreme Court of Switzerland judges
Humboldt University of Berlin alumni
Members of the Council of States (Switzerland)
People from Glarus
Presidents of the Council of States (Switzerland)
Swiss Calvinist and Reformed Christians
Swiss male writers
University of Bonn alumni
University of Zurich alumni